St. Croix or Saint Croix (from the , "holy cross") may refer to:

Places
Saint Croix, U.S. Virgin Islands
St. Croix School District
St. Croix Educational Complex
St. Croix sheep
St. Croix Soccer League
St. Croix USVI Country Day School
St. Croix River
St. Croix River (Maine–New Brunswick), which forms part of the border between Maine and New Brunswick
Saint Croix Island, Maine, an uninhabited island
St. Croix River (Wisconsin–Minnesota), which forms part of the border between Wisconsin and Minnesota
St. Croix Boom Site, a National Historic Landmark near Stillwater, Minnesota
St. Croix Chippewa Indians
St. Croix County, Wisconsin
St. Croix Falls (town), Wisconsin
St. Croix Falls, Wisconsin, a city within the town of St. Croix Falls
Saint Croix National Scenic Riverway
Saint Croix State Park, Minnesota
St. Croix Valley Railroad
St. Croix, Indiana, United States
St. Croix Island (Algoa Bay) off Port Elizabeth, South Africa
St. Croix (clothing), a clothing store founded in Minnesota
St. Croix Lutheran Academy, West St. Paul, Minnesota
St. Croix Central High School (disambiguation), several schools

Canada
St. Croix, New Brunswick, an unincorporated community near McAdam
Saint Croix Parish, New Brunswick, a civil parish north of Saint Andrews
Saint Croix (electoral district), a provincial electoral district in New Brunswick
St. Croix River (Nova Scotia), a tidal river in Hants County, Nova Scotia

People
Rick St. Croix, Canadian ice hockey goaltender
Stephen St. Croix, American artist
Steven St. Croix, pornographic actor

Other
USS Saint Croix (APA-231), an attack transport vessel
St. Croix (grape), a hybrid grape variety

See also
Sainte-Croix (disambiguation)
Croix (disambiguation)